The Silent Passenger is a British black-and-white mystery film produced in 1935 at Ealing Studios, London. It is based on an original story written by Sayers specifically for the screen. Her amateur sleuth was portrayed as a somewhat eccentric comical aristocrat who solved murders in spite of himself. As of 2014, the film is available on DVD.

Plot
Maurice Windermere, a blackmailer, is absconding to France with Mollie Ryder, one of his victims.  While waiting for the train to take them to the cross Channel ferry, he is murdered by the husband of another one of his victims, railway detective Henry Camberley (Donald Wolfit). John Ryder (John Loder), Mollie's husband, jealously searching for her, breaks into Windermere's room just after Camberley has killed Windermere and hidden him in a trunk.  Ryder assaults Camberley, who he assumes is Windermere, and demands the tickets Windermere purchased for himself and Mollie, intending to surprise his wife by taking Windermere's place on the trip abroad.  Camberley places the trunk containing Windermere's body with Windermere's other luggage, which Ryder obligingly takes with him on his journey to France.  Windermere's body is discovered in Windermere's trunk when Ryder, using Windermere's tickets, attempts to go through French customs.  The French police assume he murdered the rival for his wife's affections and return him to England by the next ferry.  Fortunately for Ryder, amateur detective Lord Peter Wimsey (Peter Haddon), who already suspected Windermere of blackmail, followed Windermere's trail onto the boat train where he struck up an acquaintance with Mollie and John Ryder. Back in England Lord Peter sets about proving his newfound friend's innocence, using Ryder as "bait" to flush out the real killer and solve the murder.

Cast
John Loder as John Ryder
Peter Haddon as Lord Peter Wimsey
Lilian Oldland as Mollie Ryder (billed as Mary Newland)
Donald Wolfit as Henry Camberley
Austin Trevor as Chief Inspector Parker
Leslie Perrins as Maurice Windermere
Aubrey Mather as Bunter
Robb Wilton as Porter
Ralph Truman as Saunders
Ann Codrington as Desk Clerk
George De Warfaz as Chief of French Police
Annie Esmond as Old Lady Passenger with Pekinese Dogs
Dorice Fordred as Camberley's Accomplice 	
Vincent Holman as Works Manager 	
Gordon McLeod as Commissioner 
Frederick Burtwell (uncredited)	
Percy Rhodes (uncredited)

References

External links
The Complete Index To World Film since 1895
The Silent Passenger on YouTube
The British Film Institute
 

1935 films
1930s crime films
British black-and-white films
British crime films
British detective films
Films directed by Reginald Denham
Films set on trains
Films set in London
Films based on British novels
Ealing Studios films
Films scored by Percival Mackey
1930s English-language films
1930s British films